Regulator of G-protein signaling 1 is a protein that in humans is encoded by the RGS1 gene.

This gene encodes a member of the regulator of G-protein signaling family. This protein is located on the cytosolic side of the plasma membrane and contains a conserved, 120 amino acid motif called the RGS domain. The protein attenuates the signalling activity of G-proteins by binding to activated, GTP-bound G alpha subunits and acting as a GTPase activating protein (GAP), increasing the rate of conversion of the GTP to GDP. This hydrolysis allows the G alpha subunits to bind G beta/gamma subunit heterodimers, forming inactive G-protein heterotrimers, thereby terminating the signal.

References

Further reading